Take the Cake is a live, interactive game show on BET. The one-hour program featured interactive games where the viewers could win cash prizes. The show aired from 12 midnight - 1 a.m. Eastern every Monday night through Friday night. The program was produced by Endemol, who produced Midnight Money Madness for TBS in 2006.

The show aired its finale on November 2, airing a total of 85 live shows.

The jocular phrase "take the cake" means "win the prize".

Rules
The contestants on Take the Cake were home viewers. United States residents 18 or older could have entered the program by text messaging a request or using the network's website. BET charged a fee for each text message entry, in addition to standard text messaging rates charged by the wireless provider. Entries on the website were free. Regardless of the method of entry, each entry had an equal chance of being selected. An entry did not necessarily guarantee an opportunity to appear on the show. Residents of certain states may have been ineligible to play various entry methods.

Games
Take the Cake featured various minigames that were played throughout the program. The rewards for the games were usually cash prizes ranging from $100 – $2,000 in cash.

To speed up the games at certain points, various methods were employed:
 Hints given by the hosts to viewers.
 A "speed round" where more calls are accepted than normal.
 The host increasing the prize amount as an incentive.
 A timer will start to represent how long the game will remain and a new one will begin.

These games were featured on Take the Cake.

These games were featured in separate segments outside of the normal rotation.

Other features
During the regular program, celebrities often appeared to help as performers during the game or to help with clues in the games.

The show also featured chances to win when it was not airing. During the daily programming, "Daily Game" questions aired in which viewers could have won cash. The entry methods and regulations were the same as the regular Take the Cake program. This feature ended October 5.

See also
 Quiz channel
 PlayMania
 Midnight Money Madness

Notes and references

External links
Take the Cake at BET.com

Phone-in quiz shows
BET original programming
2000s American game shows
2007 American television series debuts
2007 American television series endings
Television series by Endemol